The office of Lord High Constable of Ireland was used during coronations of the monarch of the United Kingdom after the Acts of Union 1800. The office was abolished after the creation of the Irish Free State in 1922.

Medieval holders
Hugh de Lacy, Lord of Meath (died 1186) "the Constable of Ireland, as he is named in the "Annals of the Four Masters""
Walter de Lacy, Lord of Meath (died 1241)
Sir John de Verdun, Lord of Westmeath, (son of Theobald le Botiller, 2nd Chief Butler of Ireland and Roesia de Verdun) and husband of Margaret, daughter of Gilbert de Lacy and coheir of the last-mentioned Walter de Lacy (died 1278) "[Margaret de Lacy] married John de Verdon, who thereby obtained the moiety of Meath, and also the office of Constable of Ireland."
Theobald de Verdon, 1st Baron Verdon (died 24 August 1309)
Theobald de Verdun, 2nd Baron Verdun, (died 27 July 1316)
The Barony of Verdon fell into abeyance on the death of Theobald in 1316.
John Talbot, 1st Earl of Shrewsbury and Waterford, husband of Maud Nevill, 6th Baroness Furnivall, great-granddaughter of Joan de Verdun, daughter of the above-mentioned Theobald, described himself as "Senescallus ac Constabularius Hiberniae" or "Steward and Constable of Ireland"
George Talbot, 4th Earl of Shrewsbury and Waterford, great-grandson of the 1st Earl of Shrewsbury, was described as "Senescallus ac Constabularius Hiberniae" or "Steward and Constable of Ireland" in a deed of 2 July, 24 Henry VII and in two deeds of 19 July, 13 Henry VIII (1521)

Lords High Constable of Ireland at Coronations
At this point, the office merged with the Crown and was revived only for coronations. It was held at coronations by the following individuals:

See also
Lord High Constable of England
Lord High Constable of Scotland

References

External links
A view of the legal institutions, honorary hereditary offices, and feudal baronies, established ... - William Lynch, 1830 - Chapter IV, Page 66
Unpublished statute entered on the Chancery Roll, Dublin, in the year 1460, relative to the independence of Ireland

Positions within the British Royal Household
Great Officers of State of Ireland
Ceremonial officers in the United Kingdom
Political office-holders in pre-partition Ireland